Gerald Marlin "Jerry Bo" Coleman (born July 1, 1936) is an American former radio personality.

Born in Wilson, Texas, the son of Grover and Christeen Coleman. Coleman worked on cotton as a teenager. He worked at the RC Bottling Company. He attended at the Texas Tech University. After listening to the radio, Coleman had gotten his love passion when he listed to the country music station KLLL-FM.

Coleman was hired to work as a radio personality for the KDUB-FM. He then worked for the KSEL-FM. As a radio personality, Coleman had his own radio program that became popular in Lubbock, Texas, in which his program had captivated audiences that included young males and females. He had worked as a radio personality for KDAV, in which he had his own radio program. Coleman resided to Los Angeles, California and then later currently resides in Lubbock, Texas.

References 

1936 births
Living people
People from Lynn County, Texas
People from Lubbock, Texas
American radio hosts
Radio personalities from Texas
Texas Tech University alumni